is a railway station in the town of Ono, Tamura District, Fukushima Prefecture, Japan operated by East Japan Railway Company (JR East).

Lines
Natsui Station is served by the Ban'etsu East Line, and is located 36.7 rail kilometers from the official starting point of the line at Iwaki Station.

Station layout
The station has one side platform serving a single bi-directional track. The station is unattended.

History
Natsui Station opened on October 10, 1917. The station was absorbed into the JR East network upon the privatization of the Japanese National Railways (JNR) on April 1, 1987.

Surrounding area
Natsui River
Natsui Post Office

See also
 List of railway stations in Japan

External links

  JR East Station information 

Stations of East Japan Railway Company
Railway stations in Fukushima Prefecture
Ban'etsu East Line
Railway stations in Japan opened in 1917
Ono, Fukushima